Ghiz is a surname. Notable people with the surname include:

 Robert Ghiz (born 1974), 33rd premier of Prince Edward Island, Canada
 Joe Ghiz (1945–1996), 29th premier of Prince Edward Island, Canada